Johann Heinrich Hasselhorst (4 April 1825, Frankfurt am Main7 August 1904, Frankfurt am Main) was a German genre painter and drawing teacher.

Life and work 
He began his studies in 1842 at the Städelschule, where his primary instructors were Jakob Becker and Moritz von Schwind. He continued his studies in Paris (1852) and Rome (1855).

In 1861, he accompanied the "Nordland Trip", a private expedition to Jan Mayen and Iceland, organized by the financier and landowner, . During the trip, he created numerous landscapes and coastal scenes of both areas, which are now on display at the Historical Museum, Frankfurt. In 1863, a travelogue of the journey was published, with his illustrations.

During this time, he became a drawing teacher at the Städelschule. One of his early students was the polar explorer, Julius von Payer, who would become known for his monumental depictions of his own adventures.

He is interred at Frankfurt Main Cemetery. Many of his best known works may be seen at the Museum Giersch.

Sources 
 Faszination Fremde. Bilder aus Europa, dem Orient und der Neuen Welt, Museum Giersch, Frankfurt am Main, 2013
 Magie des Augenblicks – Skizzen und Studien in Öl, Museum Giersch, Frankfurt am Main, 2009
 Frankfurt und der Nordpol, Historisches Museum Frankfurt, Frankfurt am Main, 2007, 
 Johann Heinrich Hasselhorst und seine Schüler. Zwei Generationen am Städel, Exhibition catalog, Gesellschaft zur Förderung Frankfurter Malerei, Eugenie Börner (Ed.), 2004,

External links 

 More works by Hasselhorst @ ArtNet
 

1825 births
1904 deaths
German painters
German genre painters
Städelschule alumni
Artists from Frankfurt